Yasmani (also Yasmany) is a masculine given name of Cuban origin that may refer to:

Yasmani Copello (born 1987), Cuban-Turkish hurdler
Yasmani Duk (born 1988), Bolivian footballer
Yasmani Grandal (born 1988), Cuban-American baseball player
Yasmani Romero (born 1988), Cuban Olympic weightlifter
Yasmany Tomás (born 1990), Cuban baseball player

masculine given names